Nedyalka Boyanova Angelova (born 26 June 1949) is a Bulgarian athlete. She competed in the women's pentathlon at the 1972 Summer Olympics.

References

External links
 

1949 births
Living people
Athletes (track and field) at the 1972 Summer Olympics
Bulgarian pentathletes
Bulgarian female hurdlers
Olympic athletes of Bulgaria
People from Kyustendil
Universiade silver medalists for Bulgaria
Universiade medalists in athletics (track and field)
Medalists at the 1970 Summer Universiade
Sportspeople from Kyustendil Province